Dominique Erbani (born August 16, 1956) is a retired French international rugby union player. He played as a back-row forward.

He won 46 caps for France between 1981 and 1990, scoring 3 tries. He played in the 1987 Rugby World Cup Final defeat against New Zealand.

References

External links

L'equipe Profile

1956 births
French rugby union players
Living people
France international rugby union players
Sportspeople from Dordogne
SU Agen Lot-et-Garonne players
Rugby union flankers